Jonathan Bruce was an 18th-century Anglican priest in Ireland.

Bruce was born in County Cork and educated at Trinity College, Dublin.  He was Dean of Kilfenora from 1724 to 1757.

References

Deans of Kilfenora
18th-century Irish Anglican priests
People from County Cork
Alumni of Trinity College Dublin